Homalopoma amussitatum is a species of small sea snail with calcareous opercula, a marine gastropod mollusk in the family Colloniidae.

Description
The height of the shell reaches 16 mm.

Distribution
This marine species occurs off the Kuriles, Russia to Northern Japan.

References

 Trew, A., 1984. The Melvill-Tomlin Collection. Part 30. Trochacea. Handlists of the Molluscan Collections in the Department of Zoology, National Museum of Wales.

External links
 To Biodiversity Heritage Library (1 publication)
 To Encyclopedia of Life
 To World Register of Marine Species

Colloniidae
Gastropods described in 1861